Federica Rossi (born 7 June 2001) is an Italian tennis player.

She has career-high rankings by the WTA of 605 in singles and 531 in doubles.

Rossi made her WTA Tour main-draw debut at the 2019 Palermo Ladies Open, in the doubles draw, partnering Elisabetta Cocciaretto.

ITF Circuit finals

Singles: 1 (runner-up)

Doubles: 4 (2 titles, 2 runner-ups)

References

External links
 
 
 

2001 births
Living people
Italian female tennis players
People from Sondrio
Sportspeople from the Province of Sondrio
21st-century Italian women